Sefton Coast is a 4605.3 hectare (11379.9 acre) Site of special scientific interest which stretches for 12 miles (20 km)  between Southport and Waterloo, which is end location of Crosby Beach. The site was notified in 2000 for both its biological and geological features.  The coast has species such as grass of Parnassus, wild orchids, rare butterflies, sand lizards, natterjack toads and waders.

Sefton Coast includes Crosby beach which is also the site of an art installation by Antony Gormley, called Another Place. Further north is the National Trust site of Formby Point containing pinewoods and sand dunes. The whole of the coastline here is managed as a Special Area of Conservation(SAC) for its important wildlife reserves by Sefton Coast Partnership. The pine woods at Victoria Road have been established as a National Trust reserve for the red squirrel, listed on the endangered species list. Formby is one of several sites in Britain where the red squirrel can still be found although it is now being threatened by the grey squirrel.

The coast is also famous for the presence of Natterjack toads in Formby. Formby is only one of a few sites in England where they will breed. Later in the evening the male's distinctive song can be heard and is known locally as the 'Bootle Organ'. In spring the males gather at the edge of shallow pools in the dune slacks and sing to attract a mate. The Sefton Coast and Countryside Service are working hard to keep these pools from growing over so that they are ready each spring for this annual event.

References

Natural England citation sheet
Sefton Coast website

Sites of Special Scientific Interest in Merseyside
Natural regions of England